Trochosa abdita is a spider in the family Lycosidae ("wolf spiders"), in the infraorder Araneomorphae ("true spiders").
It is found in the USA.

References

Lycosidae
Spiders described in 1934